

Crown
Head of State - Queen Elizabeth II

Federal government
Governor General - Adrienne Clarkson then Michaëlle Jean

Cabinet
Prime Minister - Paul Martin
Deputy Prime Minister -  Anne McLellan
Minister of Finance -  Ralph Goodale
Minister of Foreign Affairs - Pierre Pettigrew
Minister of National Defence - Bill Graham
Minister of Health -  Ujjal Dosanjh
Minister of Industry -  David Emerson
Minister of Heritage -  Liza Frulla
Minister of Intergovernmental Affairs - Lucienne Robillard
Minister of the Environment - Stéphane Dion
Minister of Justice -  Irwin Cotler
Minister of Transport -  Jean Lapierre
Minister of Citizenship and Immigration - Judy Sgro then Joe Volpe
Minister of Fisheries and Oceans - Geoff Regan
Minister of Agriculture and Agri-Food - Andy Mitchell
Minister of Public Works and Government Services - Scott Brison
Minister of Natural Resources - John Efford
Minister of Human Resources and Skills Development - Joe Volpe then Lucienne Robillard then Belinda Stronach
Minister of Social Development - Ken Dryden

Members of Parliament
See: 38th Canadian parliament

Party leaders
Liberal Party of Canada - Paul Martin
Conservative Party of Canada - Stephen Harper
Bloc Québécois - Gilles Duceppe
New Democratic Party - Jack Layton

Supreme Court justices
Chief Justice: Beverley McLachlin
John C. Major
Michel Bastarache
William Ian Corneil Binnie
Louis LeBel
Marie Deschamps
Morris Fish
Louise Charron
Rosalie Abella

Other
Speaker of the House of Commons - Peter Milliken
Governor of the Bank of Canada - David Dodge
Chief of the Defence Staff - General R.R. Henault, then General Rick Hillier

Provinces and Territories

Premiers
Premier of Alberta - Ralph Klein
Premier of British Columbia - Gordon Campbell
Premier of Manitoba - Gary Doer
Premier of New Brunswick - Bernard Lord
Premier of Newfoundland and Labrador - Danny Williams
Premier of Nova Scotia - John Hamm
Premier of Ontario - Dalton McGuinty
Premier of Prince Edward Island - Pat Binns
Premier of Quebec - Jean Charest
Premier of Saskatchewan - Lorne Calvert
Premier of the Northwest Territories - Joe Handley
Premier of Nunavut - Paul Okalik
Premier of Yukon - Dennis Fentie

Commissioners
Commissioner of Yukon - Jack Cable then Geraldine Van Bibber
Commissioners of Northwest Territories - Glenna Hansen then Tony Whitford
Commissioners of Nunavut - Peter Irniq then Ann Meekitjuk Hanson

Lieutenant-governors
Lieutenant-Governor of Alberta - Lois Hole, then Normie Kwong
Lieutenant-Governor of British Columbia - Iona Campagnolo
Lieutenant-Governor of Manitoba - John Harvard
Lieutenant-Governor of New Brunswick - Herménégilde Chiasson
Lieutenant-Governor of Newfoundland and Labrador - Edward Roberts
Lieutenant-Governor of Nova Scotia - Myra Freeman
Lieutenant-Governor of Ontario - James Bartleman
Lieutenant-Governor of Prince Edward Island - Léonce Bernard
Lieutenant-Governor of Quebec - Lise Thibault
Lieutenant-Governor of Saskatchewan - Lynda Haverstock

Mayors
see also list of mayors in Canada
Toronto - David Miller
Montreal - Gérald Tremblay
Vancouver - Larry Campbell
Ottawa - Bob Chiarelli
Winnipeg - Sam Katz
Edmonton - Stephen Mandel
Calgary - Dave Bronconnier
Victoria - Alan Lowe

Religious leaders
Roman Catholic Archbishop of Quebec and Primate of Canada - Cardinal Archbishop Marc Ouellet
Roman Catholic Archbishop of Montreal -  Cardinal Archbishop Jean-Claude Turcotte
Roman Catholic Bishops of London - Bishop Ronald Peter Fabbro
Roman Catholic Archbishop of Toronto -  Cardinal Archbishop Aloysius Ambrozic
Primate of the Anglican Church of Canada -  Andrew Hutchison
Moderator of the United Church of Canada - Peter Short
Moderator of the Presbyterian Church in Canada -  Richard Fee
National Bishop of the Evangelical Lutheran Church in Canada -  Raymond Schultz

See also
2004 Canadian incumbents
Events in Canada in 2005
2006 Canadian incumbents
 incumbents around the world in 2005
 Canadian incumbents by year

2005
Incumbents
Canadian incumbents
Canadian leaders